The following is a list of people from Butler County, Kansas.  The area includes the cities of El Dorado, Augusta, Rose Hill, and other cities rural areas in the county.  Inclusion on the list should be reserved for notable people past and present who have resided in the county, either in cities or rural areas.

Family of Barack Obama
 Madelyn Dunham, maternal grandmother of Barack Obama, the 44th President of the United States of America
 Stanley Armour Dunham, paternal grandfather of Barack Obama, the 44th  President of the United States of America
 Charles T. Payne,  served in the U.S. military during World War II as a member of the division that liberated Ohrdruf, a subcamp of the Buchenwald concentration camp. He was 20 years old at the time. He is Barack Obama's great uncle (the younger brother of his late maternal grandmother Madelyn Lee Payne Dunham) and has been mentioned in Obama's speeches including the one given in 2009 commemorating the anniversary of D-Day.

Arts
 Steve Brodie, film actor
 Phyllis Haver, actress of the silent film era
 Jack Marshall, composer of the theme and incidental music for the 1960s TV series The Munsters
 Marion Koogler McNay, painter and art teacher who inherited a substantial oil fortune upon the death of her father; willed her fortune to be used to establish San Antonio's first museum of modern art, which today bears her name
 Kevin Schmidt, actor
 Mort Walker, comic artist best known for creating the newspaper comic strips Beetle Bailey in 1950 and Hi and Lois in 1954

Athletics
 Beals Becker, outfielder in Major League Baseball from 1908 to 1915
 Monty Beisel, professional American football linebacker with the Kansas City Chiefs and other teams
 Ernie Blandin, professional American football offensive tackle who played six seasons for the Cleveland Browns and Baltimore Colts in the National Football League and All-America Football Conference (AAFC)
 Tom Borland, relief pitcher in Major League Baseball who played from 1960 through 1961 for the Boston Red Sox
 Kendall Gammon, professional football player
 Ralph Graham, college football and basketball player and coach
 Larry Hartshorn, professional offensive lineman with the Chicago Cardinals
 Tom Sturdivant, Major League Baseball pitcher who played for the New York Yankees, Kansas City Athletics, Boston Red Sox, Washington Senators, Pittsburgh Pirates, Detroit Tigers, and New York Mets
 Josh Swindell, Major League Baseball pitcher for the Cleveland Naps
 Ralph Winegarner, professional baseball player

Old west
 Frank H. Maynard, old-time cowboy of the American West who claimed authorship of the revised version of the well-known ballad, "The Streets of Laredo"

Politics
 Garner E. Shriver, U.S. Representative from Kansas
 William Allen White, newspaper editor, politician, author, and leader of the Progressive movement
 Gerald Burton Winrod, pro-Nazi and anti-Semitic evangelist, author, and political activist

Technology
 Almon Brown Strowger, early innovator of telephone technology

See also

 Lists of people from Kansas

References

Butler County